Madonna del Carmine may refer to:

 Madonna del Carmine, title given to the Blessed Virgin Mary in her role as patroness of the Carmelite Order
 Madonna del Carmine, Marsico Nuovo, a Roman Catholic church located of Marsico Nuovo, Italy
 Sanctuary of the Madonna del Carmine, Riccia, a Roman Catholic church of Riccia, Italy
 Santuario della Madonna del Carmine, Catania,

See also 

 Madonna del Carmelo (disambiguation)
 Santa Maria del Carmine (disambiguation)